Spruce Creek Airport  is a private airport located in Port Orange, seven miles (11 km) south of the central business district of Daytona Beach, in Volusia County, Florida, United States.  It was originally constructed during World War II as an outlying field (OLF) to nearby Naval Air Station DeLand and NAS Daytona Beach.  OLF Spruce Creek originally had four paved 4,000 foot runways and was abandoned by the U.S. Navy in 1946.

Facilities and aircraft 
For a 12-month period the airport had 25,000 general aviation aircraft operations, an average of 68 per day. There are 438 aircraft based at this airport: 67% single-engine, 31% multi-engine, 1% jet and 1% helicopter.

References

External links 
Pictures and Views of the Spruce Creek Fly-In Community
Community Information website
News and Activities website
Spruce Creek German Language Website

History of Spruce Creek
Spruce Creek Community, history and origins

Airports in Volusia County, Florida
Residential airparks
Buildings and structures in Port Orange, Florida
1940s establishments in Florida
Closed installations of the United States Navy